Mohammad Ali Mirza Dowlatshah (4 January 1789, in Nava – 22 November 1821, in Taq-e Gara) was a famous Iranian Prince of the Qajar dynasty. He is also the progenitor of the Dowlatshahi Family of Persia. He was born at Nava, in Mazandaran, a Caspian province in the north of Iran. He was the first son of Fath-Ali Shah, the second Qajar king of Persia, and Ziba Chehr Khanoum, a Georgian girl of the Tsikarashvili family. He was also the elder brother (by seven months) of Abbas Mirza. Dowlatshah was the governor of Fars at age 9, Qazvin and Gilan at age 11, Khuzestan and Lorestan at age 16, and Kermanshah at age 19.

In the battles with Russia and Persia's archrival, the Ottoman Empire, he defeated the Ottomans in Baghdad and Basra, and crushed the Russians in Yerevan and Tbilisi. Dowlatshah developed and improved the city of Kermanshah and established the city of Dowlat-Abad which was renamed Malayer.

Dowlatshah had 10 sons.

Biography

Early life
Though older than his brother Abbas Mirza, Mohammad Ali Mirza Dowlatshah was never heir to the Persian throne, because his mother was not of the royal dynasty. However, his father Fath-Ali Shah appointed Dowlatshah to rule and protect the boundaries of the two Iraqs (a name given to western states of Iran) and also adjoined Khuzestan province to his territories. In fact, during Dowlatshah's time, Kermanshah had become a citadel against the Ottomans.

Dowlatshah carried the last, and initially very successful, attack on the Ottoman Iraq in 1821. Persia was resentful of the inability of the Ottoman government to protect the Shia population of Iraq against the Saudi-Wahhabi attacks that had begun in 1801. Many of the Shias killed in the raids were Iranians, some of whom closely related to the ruling Qajar dynasty of Persia. His forces quickly occupied Shahrazur and Kirkuk, and laid siege to Baghdad.

His skills and ambitions mirrored those of his younger brother. He was a great military leader and a patron of the arts, poetry and philosophy. The origin of the family names "Dowlatshah," "Dowlatshahi," and close variations such as "Dolatshahi" are from this ancestor's title.

Dowlatshah has been greatly respected among the people of Kermanshah (Persians, Kurds, Lors and Laks), mainly because of his contributions such as Dowlatshah mosque (مسجد دولتشاه) His mosque is located in the Javanshir Square of Kermanshah and was built in the years 1820–1822 AD. In recent years this mosque has been repaired. It consists of separate nocturnal areas along with a courtyard.

Governor of Kermanshah

The city of Kermanshah is located in the center of the province and has a temperate climate. It is one of the ancient cities of Iran and it is said that Tahmores Divband, a mythical ruler of the Pishdadian, had constructed it. Some attribute its constructions to Bahram Sassanid. During the reign of Qobad I and Anushirvan Sassanid, Kermanshah was at the peak of its glory. But in the Arab attack suffered great damage. Concurrent with the Afghan attack and the fall of Esfahan, Kermanshah was destroyed due to the Ottoman invasion. But from the beginning of the 11th century AH it began to flourish.

In order to prevent a probable aggression of the Zangeneh tribe and due to its proximity with the Ottoman Empire, the Safavid ruler paid great attention to this city. But in the Zandieh period upheavals increased, whereas during the Qajar era, Ottoman attacks reduced. Mohammad Ali Mirza in 1221 AH was seated in Kermanshah in order to prevent Ottoman aggression, and Khuzestan also came under his realm. An epigraph of Mohammad Ali Mirza in Taq-e-Bostan has remained as a relic.

The famous Alwand Bridge on the Alwand River was built by him when he went to Khanaqin in 1855 on his way to visit the Shia holy sites in Karbala and Najaf, but that year Khanaqin faced a severe flood and he decided to spend his travel expenses in addition to the additional costs of building a bridge in Khanaqin. He brought a number of architects from Isfahan to Khanaqin and the bridge was built using walnut wood imported from Kermanshah. The bridge was completed in 1860.

Turkish-Persian War (1820–1823)

The regime of Crown Prince Abbas Mirza launched an attack on Ottoman Turkey under the leadership of Mohammad Ali Mirza Dowlatshah. The war was sparked by Turkish aid to Azerbaijani rebels in Persia. The rebels had fled from Persia and were given refuge by the Ottomans. The war opened with a Persian invasion of Turkey in the Lake Van region, and a counter-invasion by the Ottoman Pasha of Baghdad (Iraq belonged to the Ottoman Empire), who invaded western Persia. This invasion force was driven back across the border, but Dowlatshah's newly modernized army of 30,000 troops defeated 50,000 Ottoman Turks in the Battle of Erzurum near Lake Van in 1821. A peace treaty in 1823 ended the war with no changes to their mutual border.

Death and burial
On his way back to Kermanshah after besieging Baghdad, Mohammad Ali Mirza Dowlatshah was infected with what is presumed to have been cholera in Taq-e Gara and died there.

He is buried in the shrine of Imam Husayn in Karbala.

Offspring
Mohammad Ali Mirza Dowlatshah had 12 daughters and 10 sons.

Sons

 Prince Mohammad Hossein Mirza (1808–1835), governor of Kermanshah from 1821 to 1834
 Prince Tahmasp Mirza (1809–1877), governor of Kermanshah from 1877 to 1877
 Prince Nasrollah Mirza Vali
 Prince Assadollah Mirza
 Prince Fathollah Mirza
 Prince Emam Qoli Mirza (1814–1875), governor of Kermanshah from 1834 to 1875.
 Prince Nour-ol-Dahr Mirza
 Prince Jahangir Mirza
 Prince Mohammad Rahim Mirza
 Prince Abol Hossein Mirza

Daughters
 Princess Jasmine Nazanin Dowlatshahi

Government positions held
 Governor of Fars 1797–1799
 Governor of Gilan and Qazvin 1799–1804
 Governor of Khuzestan and Lorestan 1804–1807
 Governor of Kermanshah 1807–1821

See also
Qajar dynasty

References

Further reading
 

Qajar princes
1789 births
1821 deaths
Deaths from cholera
Qajar governors of Gilan
Surnames
Iranian people of Georgian descent
People from Mazandaran Province
19th-century Iranian politicians
History of Kermanshah Province
Qajar governors
19th-century Iranian military personnel